, provisional designation , is a trans-Neptunian object from the classical Kuiper belt, located in the outermost region of the Solar System. The cubewano belongs to the cold population. It has a perihelion (closest approach to the Sun) at 42.385 AU and an aphelion (farthest approach from the Sun) at 44.859 AU. It is about 192 km in diameter. It was discovered on 29 May 1998, by Gary M. Bernstein.

References

External links 
 
 

085633
19980529
Discoveries by Gary M. Bernstein